The Guinness Partnership is one of the largest providers of affordable housing and care in England. Founded as a charitable trust in 1890, it is now a Community Benefit Society with eight members. Bloomberg classify it as a real estate owner and developer.

, the Partnership owns and manages around 66,000 homes with a historic cost value of £3.7 billion, and provides services to more than 140,000 people. It had financial reserves of £723 million.

History
The Guinness Trust was founded in 1890 by Edward Guinness, 1st Earl of Iveagh, a great-grandson of the founder of the Guinness Brewery, to help homeless people in London and Dublin. He donated £200,000 to set up the Guinness Trust in London, the equivalent of £25 million in today's money.

At the beginning of the 20th century, the Iveagh Trust based in Dublin took responsibility for Ireland. The Guinness Trust extended its objectives outside London in 1962, eventually operating in all parts of England. It was not related to the brewery company. The history of its first century was published by Peter Malpass in 1998.

In 1992, the Guinness Trust Group acquired the Parchment Group, parent company of Hermitage Housing Association. The combined group is now known as The Guinness Partnership. Northern Counties Housing Association joined the Partnership in 2008.

In 2022, Guinness Partnership announced that it has joined the G15 group of large housing associations in London, the body which aims to provide a collective voice for large, registered housing providers in the capital.

Structure
In 2012, the housing properties and operations of The Guinness Trust were combined with those of the other main housing divisions in the Group to form a single charitable company operating nationwide, The Guinness Partnership Limited.

The Guinness Partnership and Wulvern Housing Limited merged on 31 January 2017. 

The sales and marketing team is responsible for the sales of the Partnership's shared ownership and market sale properties across England. They are known as Guinness Homes and have a separate website to the Partnership's main website.

See also
Iveagh Market
Housing in the United Kingdom
Real estate in the United Kingdom

References

External links

 
 The Guinness Partnership 125th anniversary microsite
 

Housing associations based in England
1890 establishments in England
Charities based in England
Organizations established in 1890
Guinness family